Maculauger alveolatus is a species of sea snail, a marine gastropod mollusk in the family Terebridae, the auger snails.

Description

Distribution
The holotype was found in the Malacca Strait.

References

External links
 Hinds R.B. (1844 ["1843"). Descriptions of new shells, collected during the voyage of the Sulphur, and in Mr. Cuming's late visit to the Philippines. Proceedings of the Zoological Society of London. 11: 149-159]
 Fedosov, A. E.; Malcolm, G.; Terryn, Y.; Gorson, J.; Modica, M. V.; Holford, M.; Puillandre, N. (2020). Phylogenetic classification of the family Terebridae (Neogastropoda: Conoidea). Journal of Molluscan Studies

Terebridae
Gastropods described in 1844